Mohamed Dzaiddin bin Abdullah (born 16 September 1938) is a retired Malaysian lawyer who served as the third Chief Justice of Malaysia.

He had his early education at Sultan Abdul Hamid College (Alor Setar, Kedah). In 1956 he worked as a journalist with The Malay Mail (Kuala Lumpur) and later joined the Royal Malayan Police Force as an Inspector.

In June 2000, he was bestowed the Grade of Panglima Setia Mahkota (PSM) by the Yang DiPertuan Agong, which carries the title "Tan Sri".
Subsequently, in June 2002, he was bestowed the Grade of Seri Setia Mahkota (SSM) by the Yang DiPertuan Agong, which carries the title "Tun".

An avid golfer, Dzaiddin is married to Tengku Toh Puan Noriah and they have two children.

On 4 February 2004 Dzaiddin was appointed by the Yang di Pertuan Agong as chairman of the Royal Commission to Enhance the Operation and Management of the Royal Malaysia Police. On 30 April 2005,the Report was submitted to the Government. It contained 125 recommendations, the core proposal was the establishment of a body called the Independent Police Complaints and Misconduct Commission (IPCMC).

Honours

Honours of Malaysia
  : 
 Commander of the Order of Loyalty to the Crown of Malaysia (PSM) – Tan Sri (2000)
 Grand Commander of the Order of Loyalty to the Crown of Malaysia (SSM) – Tun (2002)
 
 Companion of the Order of the Defender of State (DMPN) – Dato' (1987)
 
Knight Companion of the Order of the Gallant Prince Syed Putra Jamalullail (DSPJ) – Dato' (1996)
 Knight Grand Commander of Order of the Crown of Perlis (SPMP)	– Dato' Seri (2012)
 
 Grand Knight of the Order of Cura Si Manja Kini (SPCM) – Dato' Seri (2001)

References

Chief justices of Malaysia
20th-century Malaysian judges
21st-century Malaysian judges
Malaysian people of Malay descent
Malaysian Muslims
People from Perlis
Living people
1938 births
Commanders of the Order of Loyalty to the Crown of Malaysia
Grand Commanders of the Order of Loyalty to the Crown of Malaysia
Members of the Middle Temple